Hubert Humphrey unsuccessfully ran for president thrice:

Hubert Humphrey presidential campaign, 1952, the failed campaign Hubert Humphrey conducted in 1952
Hubert Humphrey presidential campaign, 1960, the failed campaign Hubert Humphrey conducted in 1960
Hubert Humphrey presidential campaign, 1968